Upshaw is a surname of English origin.  Notable people with this name include:

Alexander B. Upshaw (1874-1909), a Crow people ('Apsaroke') American - Indian interpreter and assistant to photographer and writer Edward S. Curtis in documenting Native Americans in the United States
Cecil Upshaw (1942–1995), American baseball player
Courtney Upshaw (born 1989), American football player
Dawn Upshaw (born 1960), American operatic and classical soprano
Gene Upshaw (1945–2008), American football player
Grace Upshaw (born 1975), American Olympic track and field athlete
Jessica Upshaw (1959–2013), American politician and lawyer
Jody Upshaw (born 2003), Canadian R&B musician
Kelvin Upshaw (born 1963), American basketball player
L. W. Upshaw, American college football coach
Marvin Upshaw (born 1946), American football player
Orrin Upshaw (1874–1937), American Olympic tug-of-war athlete
Regan Upshaw (born 1975), American football player
 Reggie Upshaw (born 1995), American basketball player in the Israel Basketball Premier League
Robert Upshaw (born 1994), American basketball player
T. D. Upshaw (fl. 1930–1931), American college football coach
William D. Upshaw (1866–1952), American prohibitionist and politician from Georgia; U.S. representative 1919–27
Willie Upshaw (born 1957), American baseball player
Zeke Upshaw (1991–2018), American basketball player

English-language surnames